Brenda Daniela Gandini (born August 8, 1984) is an Argentine actress and model.

Career 
Gandini was born August 8, 1984, in Cipolletti, Argentina.

Modeling career 
Brenda Daniela Gandini began her career in modeling in the year 2003 in advertising campaigns. In 2004, she appeared on the cover of the men's magazine Hombre.

Television career 
Gandini began her career in television when she was cast by Cris Morena to be part of the cast of the youth television series Floricienta in 2005. In 2006, makes a small participation in the television series Sos mi vida. In 2006, she makes a small participation in the youth television series Chiquititas. In 2006, she made her film debut, with the movie The Hands. In 2007, she was the protagonist of the television series Romeo y Julieta with Elías Viñoles. In 2007, she was part of the play La jaula de las locas. In 2008, she was part of the cast of the television series Vidas robadas. In 2009, makes a small participation in the television series Ciega a citas. In 2009, she was part of the play El hombre Araña. From 2009 to 2010, she was part of the cast of the youth television series Niní. In 2010, she was part of the cast of the television series Los exitosos Pérez. From 2010 to 2011, she was part of the cast of the television series Malparida. In 2012, she was part of the cast of the television series La Dueña. From 2012 to 2013, she was the protagonist of the television series Mi amor, mi amor with Juan Gil Navarro and Jazmín Stuart. From 2014 to 2015, she was part of the cast of the television series Noche y día. In 2017, she was part of the cast of the television series Amar después de amar. From 2017 to 2019, she was part of the cast of the television series Samuraí. In 2018, she was part of the cast of the television series Morir de amor.

Personal life 
Since 2010, Gandini has been in a relationship with the actor Gonzalo Heredia, whom she met in the recordings of Malparida. The couple have two children: a son named Eloy Heredia, born August 16, 2011, and a daughter named Alfonsina Heredia born on August 22, 2017.

Gandini is close friends with her Romeo y Julieta co-star Inés Palombo.

Filmography

Television

Theater

Movies

Television programs

Videoclips

Discography

Soundtrack albums
 2007: Romeo y Julieta

References

External links 
 

1984 births
Living people
Actresses from Buenos Aires
Argentine female models
21st-century Argentine women singers
Argentine television actresses
Argentine people of Italian descent
21st-century Argentine women